Lost Planets & Phantom Voices is 4th album solo by Guided by Voices member Tobin Sprout released in 2003.

Track listing 
 Indian Ink - 1.55
 Doctor #8 - 2.29
 Catch The Sun - 2.30
 All Those Things We've Done - 3.04
 Martini - 3.30
 Rub Your Buddah Tummy - 3.15
 Courage The Tack - 3.13
 Earth Links - 2.06
 As Lovely As You - 2.50
 Shirley The Rainbow - 2.49
 Fortunes Theme No. 1 - 1.52
 Cleansing From The Storm - 4.27
 Let Go Of My Beautiful Balloon - 6.01

References

2003 albums
Tobin Sprout albums